Michael Andrew "Mike" Bare (born March 1983) is an American policy analyst and Democratic politician from Verona, Wisconsin.  He is a member of the Wisconsin State Assembly, representing Wisconsin's 80th Assembly district since January 2023. He is also currently a member of the Dane County board of supervisors and previously served as a legislative aide to United States senator Russ Feingold.

Biography
Mike Bare was born and raised in Manitowoc, Wisconsin.  He graduated from Manitowoc's Lincoln High School in 2001 and went on to attend American University in Washington, D.C.  He earned his bachelor's degree from American in 2006 and went on to earn his master's degree in 2010.

Since 2013, he has been employed as research director and program coordinator for Community Advocates Public Policy Institute.  The institute deals with researching existing and proposed legislation and designing model policy for alleviating and preventing poverty.  Bare played a significant role in his organization's recommendations for Affordable Care Act implementation in Wisconsin.

In 2016, he was a partner in a bid to construct and maintain a German-style beer garden in Madison's Olbrich Park.  Their proposal was ultimately approved, and Bare is now co-owner of the Olbrich biergarten.

Political career

Bare first became involved in politics during his undergraduate years.  While still a student, he was hired to work as a field organizer on John Kerry's 2004 presidential campaign.  After the election, he went to work for United States senator Russ Feingold as a legislative clerk and joined Feingold's re-election campaign as research director in 2010.  In 2013, he was appointed to the Verona city council to fill a vacancy, but was not elected to a full term in 2014.

In 2013, Bare was also one of the co-founders of the Wisconsin chapter of the New Leaders Council, which seeks to recruit and train young progressive leaders.  He served as director of the Wisconsin chapter for some time and was also chair of the organization's national programs committee.

In the Spring election of 2020, he was elected to the Dane County board of supervisors, running unopposed in an open seat.  He was re-elected without opposition in 2022.

Just after the Spring 2022 election, incumbent state representative Sondy Pope announced she would retire after 20 years in the Assembly.  Bare announced his candidacy for the Democratic nomination and faced four opponents in the primary in the heavily democratic 80th Assembly district.  Despite Pope endorsing Verona attorney and city councilmember Chad Kemp, Bare went on to win the primary with nearly 48% of the vote.  He easily prevailed in the general election over Verona Republican Jacob Luginbuhl.  

He will assume office in January 2023.

Personal life and family
Mike Bare is married to Madison attorney Tristan Breedlove.  Breedlove is an accomplished public defender, specializing in appeals, and a professor at the University of Wisconsin Law School.  They have two young children and reside in Verona, Wisconsin.

Bare's sister was born with an intellectual disability, and as a result he has had a lifelong interest in lifting up people with disabilities.  As a young man, he volunteered at a summer camp for children and adults with developmental disabilities in Manitowoc County, which his sister attended.  For over 20 years, he has been a coach and volunteer for the Special Olympics.  He was also a member of the board of directors of the nonprofit Down Syndrome Association of Wisconsin.

Electoral history

Wisconsin Assembly (2022)

| colspan="6" style="text-align:center;background-color: #e9e9e9;"| Democratic Primary, August 9, 2022

| colspan="6" style="text-align:center;background-color: #e9e9e9;"| General Election, November 8, 2022

References

External links
 Campaign website
 Official (county) website
 
 Mike Bare at Wisconsin Vote
 Olbrich Biergarten

1983 births
Living people
Democratic Party members of the Wisconsin State Assembly 
People from Manitowoc, Wisconsin
People from Verona, Wisconsin
21st-century American politicians
County supervisors in Wisconsin
American University alumni
Legislative staff